The 2017–18 Belgian Second Amateur Division is the second season of the division in its current format, placed at the fourth-tier of football in Belgium.

The division consists of three separate leagues, each containing 16 teams. Leagues A and B consist of teams with a license from the Voetbalfederatie Vlaanderen (VFV, the Dutch speaking wing of the Belgian FA), while league C contains teams with a license from the Association des Clubs Francophones de Football (ACFF, the French speaking wing of the RBFA). The champions from each of the three leagues will promote to the 2018–19 Belgian First Amateur Division. The fixtures will be announced in July 2017.

Team changes

In
 Sprimont-Comblain and WS Brussels after finishing in the relegation zone in the 2016–17 Belgian First Amateur Division.
 Hasselt was also relegated from the 2016–17 Belgian First Amateur Division after losing the Second Amateur Division promotion play-offs, where the team failed to regain its place in the First Amateur Division.
 Ingelmunster was promoted after winning the 2016–17 Belgian Third Amateur Division A.
 Turnhout was promoted after winning the 2016–17 Belgian Third Amateur Division B.
 RWDM47 was promoted after winning the 2016–17 Belgian Third Amateur Division C.
 Durbuy was promoted after winning the 2016–17 Belgian Third Amateur Division D.
 City Pirates, Pepingen,  Ronse, Sint-Lenaarts, Vosselaar were promoted as winners of the Third Amateur Division promotion play-offs VFV
 Rebecq was promoted as winners of the Third Amateur Division promotion play-offs ACFF

Out
 Knokke was promoted after winning the 2016–17 Belgian Second Amateur Division A.
 Berchem Sport was promoted after winning the 2016–17 Belgian Second Amateur Division B.
 Châtelet was promoted after winning the 2016–17 Belgian Second Amateur Division C.
 Aalst was promoted after winning the Second Amateur Division promotion play-offs.
 Halle, Menen, Grimbergen, Woluwe-Zaventem, Couvin-Mariembourg, Givry, Charleroi Fleurus and Namur were all relegated after finishing in the relegation positions the previous season.

Mergers
 Izegem merges with newly promoted Ingelmunster to form Mandel United.
 Newly promoted Pepingen, merges with relegated Halle to form Pepingen-Halle.

Belgian Second Amateur Division A

League table

Belgian Second Amateur Division B

League table

Belgian Second Amateur Division C

League table

Promotion play-offs

Promotion play-offs VFV
The teams finishing in second place in the Second Amateur Division A and Second Amateur Division B will take part in a promotion playoff first round together with three period winners from both divisions. These 8 teams from the VFV will play the first round of a promotion-playoff, with two teams qualifying for the Promotion play-offs Final. In division A, the first period was won by Petegem, the second by Mandel United and the third by champions Rupel Boom. In division B, champions Tessenderlo won all three periods.

In division A, only Mandel United and Sint-Eloois-Winkel received a license, meaning there were only two participants from this division instead of four. In division B, only Hasselt applied for a license in spite of finishing just 5 points clear of the relegation zone. The three other spots remained vacant. Overall this meant only three out of eight teams took part, with two teams qualifying for the Promotion play-offs Final. As a result of the draw, Sint-Eloois-Winkel received a bye and directly qualified for the play-offs Final.

The winner of this match will qualify for the Promotion play-offs Final together with Sint-Eloois-Winkel.

Promotion play-offs ACFF
The team finishing in second place in the Second Amateur Division C will take part in the promotion playoff first round together with three period winners. These 4 teams will play the first round of a promotion-playoff, with the winner qualifying for the Promotion play-offs Final. While champions RWDM47 won all three periods which would meant the teams in positions 2 through 5 would take part in the playoffs, only three teams effectively received a license with the fourth place remaining vacant.

ACFF Round 1
As a result of the draw, La Louvière-Centre received a bye into round 2.

ACFF Round 2

RFC Liège qualified for the Promotion play-offs Final.

Promotion play-offs Final
The two winners of the Promotion play-offs on the VFV side (Mandel United and Sint-Eloois-Winkel) and the winning team from the ACFF Promotion play-offs (RFC Liège) will play a final tournament together with the team that finished in 14th place in the 2017–18 Belgian First Amateur Division (Hamme). The winner of this play-off promotes to (or remains in) the 2018–19 Belgian First Amateur Division.

Final Round 1

RFC Liège and Hamme qualified for the Promotion play-offs Final. Mandel United and Sint-Eloois-Winkel are eliminated and remain in the Belgian Second Amateur Division.

Final Round 2

RFC Liège won 6–3 on aggregate and as a result was promoted to the 2018–19 Belgian First Amateur Division. By losing, Hamme was relegated from the 2017–18 Belgian First Amateur Division to the 2018–19 Belgian Second Amateur Division.

Relegation play-offs
The number of teams relegating from the Belgian Amateur Second Division depends on the number of teams of each wing (VFV and ACFF) relegating from the Belgian First Amateur Division. 

In case the three automatic relegation spots in the 2017–18 Belgian First Amateur Division are filled by:
 3 VFV teams, then one extra team from the VFV will need to be relegated from the 2017–18 Belgian Amateur Second Division to the 2018–19 Belgian Third Amateur Division.
 2 VFV teams (and one ACFF), no extra teams will be relegated from the 2017–18 Belgian Amateur Second Division to the 2018–19 Belgian Third Amateur Division.
 2 ACFF teams (and one VFV), then one extra team from the ACFF will need to be relegated from the 2017–18 Belgian Amateur Second Division to the 2018–19 Belgian Third Amateur Division.
 3 ACFF teams, then two extra teams from the ACFF will need to be relegated from the 2017–18 Belgian Amateur Second Division to the 2018–19 Belgian Third Amateur Division.

Additionally, in case the team from the 2017–18 Belgian First Amateur Division taking part in the Promotion play-offs Final belongs to a different wing than the winner of the Promotion play-offs Final, then an additional team would be relegated of the same wing as the relegating team from the 2017–18 Belgian First Amateur Division.

As of the end of the regular competition, the number of extra relegations for the VFV would be zero, one or two, while for ACFF it would be zero or one.

Relegation play-offs VFV
The teams finishing 14th in divisions A and B play each other in a single match to avoid relegation.

At the time of the match, it was yet uncertain how many teams from each wing would be relegated. In the end, with the relegations of Hamme, Berchem Sport and Patro Eisden Maasmechelen from the 2017–18 Belgian First Amateur Division and the addition bankruptcy of Lierse (playing in the 2017–18 Belgian First Division B), which are all VFV teams, both Zwarte Leeuw and Pepingen-Halle were eventually relegated.

Relegation play-offs ACFF
As there is only one division no playoff is organised. In case extra relegations were necessary, the teams finishing just above the relegation zone would have been relegated, starting from the bottom. With one possible extra relegation, Ciney needed to await the result of the Promotion play-offs but was eventually spared of relegation.

References

Belgian Second Amateur Division
Bel
4